ShortList was a free weekly magazine published in London. Launched in 2007, it was published by Shortlist Media Ltd., who in 2009 launched Stylist, a similar magazine for women. The magazine's print edition was discontinued in 2018 due to declining advertising revenue. Around 20 staff were estimated to have lost their jobs as a result of its closure. The magazine released its last issue on 20 December 2018.

History 
ShortList was launched on 20 September 2007 with the slogan 'For men with more than one thing on their minds', to differentiate it from the "lads' mags" of the time such as FHM and Loaded.

Joe Mackertich, current editor, states that 'it’s important to me that people pick up ShortList and feel enlivened, informed and flattered by it. It’s a mainstream magazine, but to the reader it never feels like a product aimed at everyone. It’s for them.'

Marking the occasion of ShortList’s 10th birthday, at the end of September 2017, the team put 'together a special edition of the print product, featuring an incredibly ambitious split-cover concept. Ten stars of film, sport, politics and television, all shot in white, all holding a photograph of themselves from 10 years ago.'

ShortList was published by Shortlist Media Ltd, which also owns Stylist, Emerald Street and Mr Hyde.

Circulation and Distribution 
ShortList was distributed free every Thursday in London, Manchester, Edinburgh, Glasgow, Newcastle, Leeds, Dundee and Birmingham.

The title had a circulation of 502,773 (ABC July–December 2017) and took up 58.9% of the total men’s lifestyle sector across 8 major UK cities with the largest print circulation of all men's magazines in the UK.

ShortList was a significant 'pioneer of the "freemium" publishing model – providing high quality, premium content for free to,’ the metropolitan audience.

Audience and Content
The magazine was targeted at an audience of professional males "building their careers and relationships".

ShortList described its audience as "the Met Set" (short for the Metropolitan Set) – 'who are a very different, very specific set of people [... and] are probably the most influential demographic in Britain today'.

Content included brief product reviews, pub and bar reviews (Pints and Pistachios), recipes, fashion pages, interviews and a weekly column by Danny Wallace.

Website
ShortList launched its website, shortlist.com, in September 2010 and by March 2018 had 1.8 million monthly unique users globally. The website continues to publish content, despite the print edition's closure.

ShortList Dubai 
In September 2015, ShortList launched a weekly edition in Dubai and Abu Dhabi as a license with APP Media Group, a division of ITP Publishing.

ShortList UAE covers the latest entertainment, dining, fashion, sport and travel in Dubai and Abu Dhabi. With twin websites, daily newsletters, six social media channels and one magazine distributing 70,000 copies every Wednesday, ShortList UAE  reaches both men and women aged 20–50.

Awards 
 Men’s Magazine Editor of the Year, BSME Awards, 2009
 New Editor of the Year – Consumer, BSME Awards, – Terri White 2010
 Columnist of the Year, PPA Awards, – Danny Wallace 2011
 Cover of the Year – Jeremy Clarkson, PPA Awards, 2017

Editors
The editors of the magazine were as follows:

 Joe Mackertich, July 2016 – 2018
 Martin Robinson, May 2011 – June 2016
 Terri White, August 2007 – April 2011

References

External links
 Official website
 ShortList Abu Dhabi
  ShortList Dubai

2007 establishments in the United Kingdom
2018 disestablishments in the United Kingdom
Men's magazines published in the United Kingdom
Weekly magazines published in the United Kingdom
Defunct magazines published in the United Kingdom
Free magazines
Magazines published in London
Magazines established in 2007
Magazines disestablished in 2018